Panama is a cryptographic primitive which can be used both as a hash function and a stream cipher, but its hash function mode of operation has been broken and is not suitable for cryptographic use.  Based on StepRightUp, it was designed by Joan Daemen and Craig Clapp and presented in the paper Fast Hashing and Stream Encryption with PANAMA on the Fast Software Encryption (FSE) conference 1998.  The cipher has influenced several other designs, for example MUGI and SHA-3.

The primitive can be used both as a hash function and a stream cipher. The stream cipher uses a 256-bit key and the performance of the cipher is very good reaching 2 cycles per byte.

Hash function

As a hash function, collisions have been shown by Vincent Rijmen et al. in the paper Producing Collisions for PANAMA presented at FSE 2001. The attack shows a computational complexity of 282 and with negligible memory requirements.

At FSE 2007, Joan Daemen and Gilles Van Assche presented a practical attack on the Panama hash function that generates a collision in 26 evaluations of the state updating function.

Guido Bertoni, Joan Daemen, Michaël Peeters, and Gilles Van Assche, at NIST's 2006 Second Cryptographic Hash Workshop, unveiled a Panama variant called RadioGatún. The hash function workings of RadioGatún does not have the known weaknesses that Panama's hash function has.  In turn, RadioGatún inspired the new cryptographic standard SHA-3.

See also 
 Hash function security summary

References

External links
 John Savard's page on Panama

Stream ciphers
Broken hash functions
Extendable-output functions